Musetta Tia Johnson  is an American lawyer and academic who is a judge of the United States Court of Appeals for the Armed Forces.

Education 
Johnson earned a Bachelor of Arts from Hampton University.  While at Hampton University, she joined the Alpha Kappa Alpha sorority.  Johnson earned a Juris Doctor from the Temple University Beasley School of Law, a Master of Laws from the University of Virginia School of Law, another Master of Laws from The Judge Advocate General's Legal Center and School, and a Master of Science in strategic studies from the United States Army War College.

Career 

Johnson began her career in the United States Army Judge Advocate General's Corps, where she specialized in international and national security law. She also served as a senior advisor to the director of U.S. Immigration and Customs Enforcement. In 2002, she became the first African-American female to be selected to the rank of Colonel in the U.S. Army's JAG Corps' 227-year history. During the Obama administration, she served as assistant secretary of the United States Department of Homeland Security for legislative affairs. She was a visiting fellow at the University of Virginia School of Law and is a professor of national security law at the Georgetown University Law Center.

Court of appeals service 

On November 17, 2021, President Joe Biden announced his intent to nominate Johnson to serve as a Judge of the United States Court of Appeals for the Armed Forces. On January 7, 2022, her nomination was sent to the Senate. President Biden nominated Johnson to the seat vacated by Judge Scott W. Stucky, who assumed senior status on July 31, 2021. On March 22, 2022, a hearing was held before the Senate Armed Services Committee. On April 5, 2022, her nomination was reported out of committee by a voice vote. On December 15, 2022, the United States Senate confirmed her nomination by a 76–20 vote. She was sworn in on January 3, 2023.

References 

Living people
Georgetown University Law Center faculty
Hampton University alumni
Obama administration personnel
Temple University Beasley School of Law alumni
The Judge Advocate General's Legal Center and School alumni
United States Army War College alumni
University of Virginia School of Law alumni
Year of birth missing (living people)